The name Battle of Aitape or Aitape campaign may refer to any one of three military actions in proximity to Aitape in the Western New Guinea campaign of 1944-45:

Operations Reckless and Persecution, which included landings at Aitape on April 22, 1944.
Battle of Driniumor River, also known as the Battle of Aitape, July 10-August 25, 1944
Aitape–Wewak campaign, which commenced in November 1944 and continued until the end of the war.